Faxonius alabamensis, the Alabama crayfish, is a species of freshwater crayfish that lives in Alabama, Mississippi and Tennessee.

Description

Distribution
Faxonius alabamensis is endemic to the Tennessee River drainage basin, with a range extending from Shoal Creek (Lawrence County and Hardin County, Tennessee) to Lauderdale County, Alabama.

Status
Faxonius alabamensis is listed as a species of Least Concern on the IUCN Red List. Under the NatureServe system used by The Nature Conservancy, F. alabamensis is classified as G5: "secure".

References

Cambaridae
Freshwater crustaceans of North America
Fauna of the Southeastern United States
Endemic fauna of the United States
NatureServe secure species
Crustaceans described in 1884
Taxa named by Walter Faxon
Taxobox binomials not recognized by IUCN